Phymorhynchus starmeri is a species of sea snail, a marine gastropod mollusk in the family Raphitomidae.

Description
The length of the shell attains 65.4 mm, its diameter 36.1 mm.

Distribution
This marine species was found on hydrothermal vents in the Fiji Basin.

References

External links
 OKUTANI, Takashi, and Suguru OHTA. "New buccinid and turrid gastropods from North Fiji and Lau Basins." Venus (Japanese Journal of Malacology) 52.3 (1993): 217-221
 

starmeri
Taxa named by Suguru Ohta
Gastropods described in 1993